This is a list of properties and districts in Glascock County, Georgia that are listed on the National Register of Historic Places (NRHP).

Current listings

|}

References

Glascock
Buildings and structures in Glascock County, Georgia